Paul Rodolphe Joseph Dujardin (13 June 1843, Lille - 7 November 1913, Paris) was a French engraver and photographer.

Biography 
Son of Pierre-Antoine Dujardin, a doctor, he moved to Paris in 1875 to join his brother, Gustave Alexandre, who owned a photography studio. He specialized in plates, produced by rotogravure, and done in intaglio; taken from photographs. 

He participated in the Exposition Universelle of 1878, where he presented earthenware, fabrics, and niellowork; made with a rotogravure process of his own devising. Later that year, he was named a Knight in the Legion of Honor. In 1879, he became a member of the Société française de photographie. 

He was also involved in making electrical accumulators and, together with his brothers, created "P. R. J. Dujardin et Cie". In 1890, he rented a turbine power plant on the Risle in Pont-Authou. His brother, Albert Désiré, was a builder of steam engines, and President of the Société française de photogravure, in 1900.

Publications
 La Normandie monumentale et pittoresque, édifices publics, églises, châteaux, manoirs, etc., photographs by Émile-André Letellier and others, rotogravures by Paul Dujardin. Éditions Lemasle et Cie, Le Havre, 1893-1899, five volumes : Seine-Inférieure (1893), Calvados (1895), Eure (1896), Orne (1896) and Manche (1899)

References

External links 



1843 births
1913 deaths
French engravers
Electrical equipment manufacturers
Artists from Lille